Krueppel-like factor 9 is a protein that in humans is encoded by the KLF9 gene. Previously known as Basic Transcription Element Binding Protein 1 (BTEB Protein 1), Klf9 is part of the Sp1 C2H2-type zinc finger family of transcription factors.  Several previous studies showed Klf9-related regulation of animal development, including cell differentiation of B cells, keratinocytes, and neurons.  Klf9 is also a key transcriptional regulator for uterine endometrial cell proliferation, adhesion, and differentiation, all factors that are essential during the process of pregnancy and are turned off during tumorigenesis.

Function 

The protein encoded by this gene is a transcription factor that binds to GC box elements located in the promoter. Binding of the encoded protein to a single GC box inhibits mRNA expression while binding to tandemly repeated GC box elements activates transcription.

Oxidative stress increases expression of Klf9 and overexpression of Klf9 gene sensitizes the cell to oxidative stress and reactive oxygen species (ROS).  

Using a short hairpin RNA (shRNA) to silence expression of Klf9 provides resistance for the cell to oxidative stress and ROS-related cell death.  Klf9 is upregulated by ROS and promotes ROS-related cell death.

Klf9 exhibits similarities to other known oxidative stress genes like NQO1 and HMOX1.  When exposed to the same amount of hydrogen peroxide, both mouse embryo cells and human cells produced similar amounts of Klf9 and NQO1/HMOX.  The opposite of this effect also occurs; Klf9 overexpression within the cell leads to an increase in intracellular ROS.  The end result of the increase in intracellular ROS and Klf9 is increase in cell death; with the overexpressed Klf9 gene, more cells die.  Similar cell death was found in vivo when wild-type mice were exposed to oxidative stress agent paraquat intranasally, which validated the oxidative stress-dependent Klf9 expression found in just the cell lines.

Regions around 10 kb upstream and 1 kb downstream of Klf9 transcription start site contain conserved antioxidant response elements (AREs), which are binding sites for Nrf2.  Nrf2 is a major regulator of the antioxidant response to ROS within the cell.  Klf9 is upregulated by Nrf2; when oxidative stress is high and concentration of intracellular ROS is high, Nrf2 binds to Klf9 promoter, which increases the amount of intracellular ROS, leading to cell death.  When oxidative stress is low, Nrf2 goes through its normal pathway by increasing the amount of antioxidant species within the cell and decreasing the amount of intracellular ROS.

Animal studies 

A Klf9 deficiency suppresses bleomycin-induced fibrosis in the lungs of mice.  By introducing bleomycin to lung tissue, the tissue will produce ROS and develop fibrotic lung tissue to combat the damage done by the bleomycin.  When Klf9 was knocked out in these mice, not as much fibrotic lung tissue was formed.  Because of this finding, the researchers proposed that manipulations of Klf9 levels within the body may be a valid treatment for other diseases as well, including certain types of cancer.

Interactions 

KLF9 has been shown to interact with progesterone receptor.

References

Further reading

External links 
 

Transcription factors